Goeben may refer to:

August Karl von Goeben (1816-1880), Prussian general
SMS Goeben, a German battlecruiser launched in 1911

See also
Gobin, a list of people with the surname or given name
Göbenä, the Latin name for the Kubnya River